Mosaic is a studio album by Art Blakey and the Jazz Messengers, released in January 1962 through Blue Note Records. The album's performers included Wayne Shorter (tenor saxophone), Freddie Hubbard (trumpet), Curtis Fuller (trombone), Cedar Walton (piano), Jymie Merritt (bass) and Art Blakey (drums). They recorded and performed together from 1961 into 1964. Hubbard and Walton became permanent members of the group following the 1961 departures of trumpeter Lee Morgan and pianist Bobby Timmons. The Mosaic recording session featured no alternate takes and, therefore, has yielded no bonus material in reissue.

Track listing
 "Mosaic" (Walton) - 8:13
 "Down Under" (Hubbard) - 5:29
 "Children of the Night" (Shorter) - 8:51
 "Arabia" (Fuller) - 9:10
 "Crisis" (Hubbard) - 8:33

Personnel
 Art Blakey - drums
 Freddie Hubbard - trumpet
 Curtis Fuller - trombone
 Wayne Shorter - tenor saxophone
 Cedar Walton - piano
 Jymie Merritt - bass

References 

Blue Note Records albums
Art Blakey albums
The Jazz Messengers albums
Albums produced by Alfred Lion
1962 albums